Pierre Nicolas d'Agoult (1 December 1733 – 27 February 1801) was a French general de brigade (brigadier general). He was a knight of the Order of Saint Louis.

References 
 
 
  
 

1733 births
1801 deaths
Knights of the Order of Saint Louis